The Tamil Nadu Civil Supplies Corporation is governed by Government of Tamil Nadu was registered under the Companies Act 1956. It is responsible for providing food grains, commodities for the people under Public Distribution System through Ration shops. It also provides kerosene at very low cost. Some of the commodities are Rice, Wheat, Sugar, Cooking Oil, Rava etc.,

TNCSC objectives
 Procure the products
 Store the products by own or Tamil Nadu Warehousing Corporation Warehousing Godowns 
 Supply the products by own or through Tamil Nadu Consumers Cooperative Federation Limited (TNCCF) Stores

TNCSC operation
 Direct Purchase Centre (DPC): Paddy procurement from farmers 
 Modern Rice Mills (MRM) (22 mills across Tamil Nadu) – Rice hulling are operating at these mills 
 Corporation Retail Stores(CRS): Tamil Nadu Government   Public Distribution System Stores (TN PDS Store) [Tamil Nadu Civil Supplies Corporation runs 1162 TN PDS Stores in Tamil Nadu as per Tamil Nadu Government Order]  
 Fuel Retail Outlet  [Petrol / Diesel Retail: operating 3 Indian Oil Corporation Petrol / Diesel Bunks each one at Mandarakuppam (Cuddalore District), Tirupathur (Vellore District) and Pattukkottai (Thanjavur District)] [LPG Retail Outlets: operating 5 outlets each one at Arani (Thiruvanamalai District), Thiruchi,  Udagamandalam and Mandapam & Rameshwaram (Ramanathapuram District)]  
 Kerosene Retail Outlet (KRO): operating 30 kerosene retail outlets across Tamil Nadu 
 Amudham Departmental Stores (ADS) [operating 27 Amudham Departmental Stores (ADS) across Tamil Nadu; 22 in Chennai District and 5 in Cuddalore District] 
 Warehousing Godown (WHG) [operating 17 own Warehousing Godowns]

Ration card
Ration card is issued by Tamil Nadu Civil Supplies Corporation to family residing in Tamil Nadu. It consists of Head of family Photograph with all the family members name, age, sex, No. of LPG connections printed on the backside of the card with full residential address of family. The card is issued for every five years, each years are tabulated to every month to get the commodities from ration shop. It is used as important address proof for all government applications.

References

External links
 http://www.tncsc.tn.gov.in/ Official Website
 http://www.consumer.tn.gov.in/ Civil Supplies and Consumer Protection Department

Other links

State agencies of Tamil Nadu
Government agencies established in 1972
Civil Supplies
1972 establishments in Tamil Nadu


